An elicitation technique is any of a number of data collection techniques used in anthropology, cognitive science, counseling, education, knowledge engineering, linguistics, management, philosophy, psychology, or other fields to gather knowledge or information from people. Recent work in behavioral economics has purported that elicitation techniques can be used to control subject misconceptions and mitigate errors from generally accepted experimental design practices.  Elicitation, in which knowledge is sought directly from human beings, is usually distinguished from indirect methods such as gathering information from written sources.

A person who interacts with human subjects in order to elicit information from them may be called an elicitor, an analyst, experimenter, or knowledge engineer, depending on the field of study.

Elicitation techniques include interviews, observation of either naturally occurring  behavior (including as part of participant observation) or behavior in a laboratory setting, or the analysis of assigned tasks.

List of elicitation techniques
Interviews
Existing System
Project Scope 
Brain Storming
Focus Groups
Exploratory Prototypes
User Task Analysis
Observation
Surveys
Questionnaire
Story Board

References

Psychological methodology
Cognitive science
Ethnography
Linguistic research
Methods in sociology